Thiostrepton-resistance methylase may refer to:
 RRNA (adenosine-2'-O-)-methyltransferase, an enzyme
 23S rRNA (adenosine1067-2'-O)-methyltransferase, an enzyme